Titan-Centaur refers to the combination of a Titan rocket with a Centaur upper stage. Specifically, it may refer to:
Titan IIIE
Titan IV